Guiche can refer to:
Guiche, Pyrénées-Atlantiques, a commune in the Pyrénées-Atlantiques department in south-western France. 
Gīshu, a fictional character
a slang word for perineum; see also Guiche piercing

id:Guiche